The 1958 Colorado State Rams football team represented Colorado State University in the Skyline Conference during the 1958 NCAA University Division football season.  In their third season under head coach Don Mullison, the Rams compiled a 6–4 record (4–3 against Skyline opponents), finished fourth in the Skyline Conference, and outscored opponents by a total of 178 to 110.

The team's statistical leaders included Freddy Glick with 380 passing yards, Wayne Schneider with 580 rushing yards, and Bill Hanks with 140 receiving yards.

Schedule

References

Colorado State
Colorado State Rams football seasons
Colorado State Rams football